Communication physics is one of the applied branches of physics.  It deals with various kinds of communication systems.

See also
 Electronic communication
 Optical communication
 Computer communication
 Telephone  
 Telegraph  
 Radio  
 Television
 Mobile phone communication
 Nanoscale network

Applied and interdisciplinary physics
Telecommunication theory